Jacob Kimball Jr. born on February 15, 1761, and died in Topsfield, Massachusetts July 24, 1826 was one of the first American composers. He played fife and drum in the American Revolutionary War and participated in Battle of Lexington and Bunker Hill.

List of works
 Invitation (1784) ("Hark! the Redeemer from on high") Sacred Harp p327
 Brentwood (1800) Hesperian Harp p196
 Tunbridge (1800) Hesperian Harp p88
 Woburn (1793) ("Firm was my health, my day was bright") Shenandoah Harmony p407

Discography
Woburn - Sweet Seraphic Fire New England Singing School Music
Invitation - Make A Joyful Noise: American Psalmody by American Anonymous

Tunebooks
 The Rural Harmony (1793)
 The Village Harmony (1798)
 The Essex Harmony (1800)

Bibliography
 Selected Works of Samuel Holyoke (1762–1820) and Jacob Kimball (1761–1826), eds Harry Eskew and Karl Kroeger

References

External links

1761 births
1826 deaths
Shape note
American male composers
American composers